Marcus Barlow (1890–1954) was a prominent Australian architect in the interwar period, who designed a number of notable central city buildings in his home-town of Melbourne. He is best known for the 1932 Manchester Unity Building, whose Gothic corner spire dominates the major intersection of the city.

Professional life
Marcus Barlow was born in 1890 in Melbourne. It is not known where he gained his training, and first appears as a partner in the firm of Grainger Barlow & Little in 1917. Grainger and Little were late career architects with a long history of substantial designs to their names, and wide professional networks, which no doubt helped Barlow in his later career. In 1922 FGB Hawkins became a partner, and in 1924 they left to form Barlow & Hawkins, until Barlow left to head his own firm in 1927. A vital moment of his career was being appointed by the trustees of the Howey Estate, owners of about a quarter of a city block since the first land sales in 1837, to design the 12 storey Howey Court (demolished in about 1989); Barlow went on to design three other buildings in the estate, the Manchester Unity, the Presgrave Building and the Century Building over the next decade.  Barlow managed to maintain a thirty-strong team during the economic turmoil of the Great Depression, no doubt largely due to the construction on the estate. Barlow was an enthusiastic adopter of the latest overseas styles and trends, advocating for instance for car-parking structures in the 1920s, the scrapping of the 132 ft height limit to allow for skyscrapers, and installation of air-conditioning. He was innovative on a domestic level as well, as seen in his Strawbale Home Building, in which he used straw bales as a more economical alternative to brick construction. He also had a strong social consciousness and public interest. He was also part of Oswald Barnett’s Slum Study Group (1934), Housing Investigation and Slum Abolition Board (1936). These endeavors led to him becoming the first consulting architect appointed by the Housing Commission in Victoria in 1937. He continued to practice after WWII, but 'his best days were behind him', and he died in 1954.

Notable projects

The following projects are all on the  State Government's Victorian Heritage Register.

Manchester Unity Building
One of the best known and loved buildings in Melbourne, Manchester Unity Building dominates a main intersection in Melbourne, the corner of Swanston and Collins Streets. Barlow’s proposal on behalf of the Manchester Unity Independent Order of Oddfellows took full advantage of the allowance for uninhabited elements to be built above the 132 ft height limit, by including a stepped 78 ft corner tower, the topmost point being one of the highest in Melbourne. The Melbourne City Council had only just modified the rules to require a vote on any such structure, this was the first one to come before Council in September 1930, and it was passed unanimously "as an asset to the architecture of the city".  It is in a style known locally as 'Commercial Gothic', and drew strongly from the design of the Chicago Tribune Tower (1922) by Raymond Hood. It was also the first building in Melbourne to be constructed with an escalator. Barlow prepared immense amounts of preliminary work to ensure the construction time of his works was kept to a minimum.  Believing that speed is beneficial to up to a point where it increases capital cost and stating that "this point must be accurately determined by the architect before the tenders are called for the erection of the building", the Manchester Unity Building was erected in record time with works progressing exactly to the detailed schedule that Barlow had prepared.

Century Building
Marcus Barlow's 1939 design for the Century Building, at the other end of the same block as the Manchester Unity Building, is a vertical Moderne interpretation of his earlier design. The vertical piers and small round tower are clad in off-white glazed faience tiles; Wunderlich Limited, manufacturers of faience, often used the Century Building in their advertisements, claiming that the cladding ‘gives a permanent freshness and sparkle to this fine building. Window spandrels are in hand moulded terracotta glazed neutral grey to achieve an arresting architectural contrast’. The Century Building was not only fresh and modern looking, it was also the first building in Melbourne to be air conditioned.  The Century Building's most prominent feature is the tower which is positioned at the corner of Swanston and Little Collins streets.

Colinton
A Tudor Revival style house, Colinton is considered representative of the range of houses in a variety of styles produced by Barlow and Hawkins. Marcus Barlow was a skilled publicist and Colinton was featured in an extensive article in the leading magazine "Australian Home Beautiful" in May 1927 as well as in Barlow and Hawkins's showcase publication "Australian Homes" also published in 1927; the prominence given to the design of Colinton is said to have contributed to the adoption of Tudor style for residential and commercial developments into the 1930s. The house was state heritage listed in 1997.

Croydon Baby Health Centre
The Croydon Baby Health Centre was built along with many other such centres in response to the changing social attitudes towards maternal and child health during the early twentieth century. Barlow himself held a deep interest in issues surrounding community health and it is thought that he completed the project with no commission. Built in 1930, it was designed, like Colinton, in a particularly delightful version of the Tudor or ‘Old English' style. Features include picturesque massing, half timbering, diamond pane windows, a lych gate, and a wrought iron sign. Today the building continues to be used as a children’s health centre under the title Croydon Maternal and Child Health Centre.

List of works
1923–24 Temple Court 422–428 Collins St (Grainger Little Barlow & Hawkins)
1925 Collins Gate 373 Little Collins St (Barlow & Hawkins)
1925 Public Benefit Bootery 323–325 Bourke St (Barlow & Hawkins)
1926 Colinton 92 Mont Albert Road Canterbury (Barlow & Hawkins)
1930 Croydon Baby Health Centre 12 Civic Square Croydon
1931 Howey Court 234 Collins St (demolished)
1932 Midway Court 256 Collins St
1929–32 Manchester Unity Building 91 Swanston St
1933 Hardy Brothers two storey shop 338 Collins St
1933 Miller House 357–359 Collins St
1936 Albany Court 230 Collins St
1938 Presgrave Building 273–279 Little Collins St
1939 Strawbale Home Building Maidstone St Altona
1938–1940 Century Building 125–133 Swanston St
1944 IOOF Building (later Jensen House) 339 Swanston St

Further reading
Schrader, Ben, 'Barlow, Marcus', "Encyclopaedia of Australian Architecture", 2012 Cambridge University Press
Goad, Philip, Melbourne Architecture 2009 The Watermark Press Boorawa NSW
Grow, Robin, Melbourne Art Deco 2009  Ripe Off the Press Melbourne
Van Deale, Patrick and Lumby, Roy, A Spirit of Progress: Art Deco Architecture in Australia 1997 Fine Art Publishing

References

External links
http://vhd.heritage.vic.gov.au/places/result_detail/5279
https://web.archive.org/web/20120227165035/http://www.aussieheritage.com.au/listings/vic/Melbourne/CenturyBuilding/15210
"Oddfellows building: council approves plans" The Argus 09/09/1930 http://nla.gov.au/nla.news-article4465620
Barlow, M, "Rush Building: to the editor of the Argus"  The Argus 30/7/1932 p 24 http://nla.gov.au/nla.news-article4189179
https://web.archive.org/web/20100831163106/http://www.earthgarden.com.au/strawbale/strawhouses.html
http://users.tce.rmit.edu.au/E03159/ModMelb/mm2/lect/30%27s%20&%2040%27s/mb/html/barlow.html

1890 births
1955 deaths
Architects from Melbourne